Primavera or La Primavera means the season spring in many Romance languages, and it may also refer to:

Geography
 Primavera, Chile
 La Primavera, Vichada, a municipality in Colombia
 La Primavera District, Bolognesi, Peru
 La Primavera Biosphere Reserve, a protected area in Mexico.
 Primavera, an Argentine research station in Antarctica
 Primavera, Pará, Brazil
 Primavera, Pernambuco, Brazil

People
 Dianne Primavera (born 1950), American legislator
 Elise Primavera (born 1955), American author and illustrator
 Giovan Leonardo Primavera (c. 1540–1585), composer and poet
 Giuseppe Primavera (1917–1998), Italian chess player
 Jim Primavera (born 1962), Canadian wheelchair curler
 Joseph Primavera (1926–2006), American violist and conductor
 Jurgenne H. Primavera (born 1947), widely cited Filipina marine scientist
 Nanda Primavera (1898–1995), Italian actress

Art
 Primavera exhibition, annual exhibition at the Museum of Contemporary Art Australia
 Primavera (painting) by Botticelli (c. 1482)
 Primavera Gallery, an art gallery and shop in Cambridge, England

Books
 Primavera, a novel by Francesca Lia Block
 Primavera, a literary magazine from Mount Mary University
 ‘’Primavera or, the time of your life’’, a veritable encyclopaedia of intimate domestic life by Giulia Giuffrè

Film and TV
Prima Vera (film), a 1917 German silent film starring Erna Morena
Primavera (film), a 2015 Argentine film by Santiago Giralt with Mike Amigorena and Moria Casán
Primavera (telenovela), a 1987 Venezuelan telenovela
"Primavera" (Hannibal), an episode of the television series Hannibal

Music
 Primavera Sound Festival, an annual music festival in Barcelona, Spain
 Prima Vera (band), a Norwegian comedy group
Conjunto Primavera, Mexican music band

Classical
 "La primavera" (concerto), the first concerto of Vivaldi's The Four Seasons
 "La Primavera", the first movement of Ottorino Resphighi's Trittico Botticelliano, one of his orchestral works
"Primavera", art song by Gounod
"Primavera", by Pier Adolfo Tirindelli (1858–1937)
 "Primavera", a tune by Ludovico Einaudi on the album Divenire
"La Primavera", guitar composition by Castelnuovo-Tedesco
"La Primavera", art song by Puccini
"La Primavera", orchestral work by Catalani
"La Primavera", art song by Reynaldo Hahn

Albums
Primavera!, classical album by Suzie LeBlanc and Daniel Taylor
Primavera, Eliana (singer)

Songs
 "Primavera", a Portuguese fado song, made famous by Amália Rodrigues
 "Primavera", a song by Robin Holcomb from Rockabye
 "Primavera", a song by Natalia LaFourcade from Las 4 Estaciones del Amor
 "Primavera", a song by Santana of the album Supernatural
La Primavera (song), song by Sash! (feat. Patrizia Salvadore) on the album Life Goes On
 "La Primavera", a song by Manu Chao's on the album Próxima Estación: Esperanza
Primavera, Riccardo Cocciante  1976

Sport
 Esporte Clube Primavera, a Brazilian football club, in Indaiatuba, São Paulo state
 Primavera Esporte Clube, a Brazilian football club, in Primavera do Leste, Mato Grosso state
 Campionato Nazionale Primavera, Trofeo Giacinto Facchetti, an Italian defunct under-19 football (soccer) competition
 Campionato Primavera 1, successor of Campionato Nazionale Primavera
 Campionato Primavera 2, successor of Campionato Nazionale Primavera
 Coppa Italia Primavera, an Italian football competition played for by youth teams from Campionato Primavera
 Milan–San Remo, an annual classic cycling race nicknamed "La Primavera"

Other
 Pasta primavera, a pasta and vegetable dish
 Primavera (software), a project management software package
 Primavera Online High School
 Primavera Productions, a theater production company
 Primavera Systems, a US-based vendor of project portfolio management software
 "Primavera" is a colloquial name for the Roseodendron donnell-smithii tree and its wood.
 A variant of Vespa scooter

See also
 Printemps (disambiguation)
 Springtime (disambiguation)
 Spring (disambiguation)